The 1913–14 PCHA season was the third season of the professional men's ice hockey Pacific Coast Hockey Association league. Season play ran from December 5, 1913, until February 24, 1914. Like the previous two seasons, teams were to play a 16-game schedule, but one game was cancelled. The Victoria Aristocrats club would be the PCHA champions. After the season, Victoria travelled to Toronto to play the Toronto Hockey Club, National Hockey Association (NHA) champions, in a challenge series for the 1914 Stanley Cup. Toronto won the series.

League business
Frank Patrick became league president, succeeding C. E. Doherty. The Victoria Senators changed their name to the Victoria Aristocrats. In the fall of 1913, the PCHA and the NHA agreed to support a draft arrangement, whereby the PCHA could draft NHA players annually for four years. The PCHA would draft three players on a rotating basis among the NHA teams. The first draft, in 1914, would have the PCHA select one player from Ottawa, one from Quebec, and one from the Wanderers. An agreement was made with the NHA to send the PCHA champion east to play the NHA champion for the "world's championship" at the end of the season.

Rule changes
This season marked the introduction of the blue lines used in today's official ice hockey rinks. This change was at the instigation of the Patrick brothers. The league also started awarding assists for players helping to set up a goal, allowing substitution at any time, banning players from within  of a faceoff, having separate dressing rooms for the officials, allowing the kicking of the puck except to score and added a goal line between the posts of the goal net.

Regular season

Cyclone Taylor won the scoring championship with 39 points. Taylor and Tommy Dunderdale won the goal-scoring championship with 24 goals. The top single-game scoring feat was accomplished by Eddie Oatman, who scored six goals in his final game of the season against Vancouver on February 24, 1914, to finish with 22 goals.

Victoria was in last place on January 23, but then won six games in a row to claim the league championship and the Paterson Cup.

Final standings
Note: W = Wins, L = Losses, T = Ties, GF= Goals For, GA = Goals against

Stanley Cup playoffs
After the season, Victoria travelled to Toronto to play the Toronto Blueshirts, the NHA and Stanley Cup champion. A controversy occurred when it was revealed that the Victoria club had not filed a formal challenge. A letter arrived from the Stanley Cup trustees on March 17, that the trustees would not let the Stanley Cup travel west, as they did not consider Victoria a proper challenger because they had not formally notified the trustees. However, on March 18, Trustee William Foran stated that it was a misunderstanding. PCHA president Frank Patrick had not filed a challenge, because he had expected Emmett Quinn of the NHA to make all of the arrangements in his role as hockey commissioner, whereas the trustees thought they were being deliberately ignored. In any case, all arrangements had been ironed out and the Victoria challenge was accepted.

Exhibition series
Vancouver travelled to New York, and played in a tournament with the Quebec Bulldogs and Montreal Wanderers of the NHA.

Schedule and results

a Cancelled

A game between Vancouver and Victoria was cancelled at the end of the season.

Player statistics

Goaltenders

Scoring leaders

All-Stars
 Hugh Lehman, New Westminster, goal
 Ernie Johnson, New Westminster, defence
 Frank Patrick, Vancouver, defence
 Cyclone Taylor, Vancouver, rover
 Tommy Dunderdale, Victoria, centre
 Eddie Oatman, New Westminster, right wing
 Dubbie Kerr, Victoria, left wing

Source: Coleman 1966

See also
Pacific Coast Hockey Association
List of pre-NHL seasons
1913–14 NHA season

References

Bibliography

Notes

 
PCHA
Pacific Coast Hockey Association seasons